Bynum Hall (formerly Bynum Gymnasium) is the current home of the University of North Carolina at Chapel Hill Graduate Admissions office and was the first home of North Carolina Tar Heels men's basketball team. At an executive meeting on October 2, 1903, it was revealed that school President Francis Preston Venable announced that former North Carolina Supreme Court justice William Preston Bynum donated $25,000 to have a gymnasium built in honor of his grandson who was a student at the university and had died due to typhoid fever. Architect Frank P. Milburn drafted plans for the structure, which were then approved by Bynum and the university's Board of Trustees. The building was designed to have a Greek architecture influence and had three stories with an above-ground basement. It originally contained a swimming pool, gymnasium. office spaces, and other rooms for various sports like boxing and fencing. Construction was expected to begin in mid-May, but construction was delayed because the company supplying the bricks were not organized. The building had started construction by June and had various target dates that were pushed back for undisclosed reasons and eventually the building was completed in February 1905.

Background and construction

On October 2, 1903, during an executive University committee meeting on hosted in Governor Daniel Lindsay Russell's office, school President Francis Preston Venable revealed former North Carolina Supreme Court justice William Preston Bynum donated $25,000 to the school to build a gymnasium. The donation was made in honor of Bynum's late grandson William Preston Bynum Jr. who died on vacation after becoming sick with typhoid fever before the close of his sophomore year after attending between 1889 and 1890. The building was officially announced by Dr. Eben Alexander to students in the chapel the same day to "vigorous and prolonged applause." The University had expressed desire before Bynum's donation about needing a gymnasium for faculty and students. News outlets reported different sites intentionally for the gym's location. Plans were to be started at once and then sent to Bynum for approval before construction could begin quickly. It was hoped that the construction would be completed by September 1904. At the time it was the second largest gift ever to the university, after a $38,000 donation by Mary Ann Smith. Venable commented that: "The University is getting along finely in every way and we are greatly cheered by Judge Bynum's gift."

Architect Frank P. Milburn created plans for the building. In February 1904, President Venable announced that the building's plans had been approved by Bynum and the trustees and work will begin "at once," weather permitting. It was to be , with three stories and an above ground basement. The building itself was created with a Greek influence and was to feature a Powhatan grey mottled brick and terra cotta trimmings. The roof was to be slate and the front would feature a central portico. There were to be arched openings and pilasters on the sides of the venue for the gymnasium. It was designed symmetrically and has quoins at each corner. The building included a main gymnasium floor and equipment, a swimming pool, locker rooms with eleven showers, a running track gallery that was above the floor, a room for "Swedish movements," and rooms for fencing and boxing, among other amenities. In addition, there were lounges for the students and office spaces for faculty. The building was expected to be heated by a hot water system, along with electrical work for lighting. The prospect of building the new gym caused some relief with regards to Memorial Hall, which had been hosting physical activities and suffered many broken windows.

The Morning Post reported on May 10, 1904, that material for the gymnasium had arrived to campus and work was expected to be starting that week. At this point the location of the building was more defined as to be between Smith library and the Carr Building. Mr. Waring of Columbia, South Carolina was announced to be the contractor responsible for building the structure, along with building the Campus Y building concurrently. The construction was revealed to be delayed because the company supplying the bricks did not have their plant properly set up initially. The construction was expected to be uninterrupted during the 1904 summer. By mid-July, it was thought that the construction of the gym would be completed in the fall. An update in November on construction was published by The Evening Tribune, where it stated that the building was coming along rapidly, but the new target finish date was in February 1905. Student newspaper The Tar Heel wrote a column in early February 1905, where it commented on the beauty of the building and pleaded to the student body to keep it in good condition. On February 20, it was announced that the gym had been completed. The building was regarded as one of the most completely equipped gyms in the south, as well as being a "handsome" and "modern" structure.

History

Following the gym's opening, the swimming pool was filled in early April. It was reported that the first few days students used the pool, the water was freezing cold. It was announced that the building would be formally presented at the spring 1905 commencement on May 30 at noon. Bynum was unable to attend the event in part due to his age at the time. Instead, Venable read two letters from Bynum aloud to the crowd, one where he expressed desire to sponsor the gymnasium and a formal letter presenting the gymnasium to the university. In addition, he explained his reasoning for choosing the University of North Carolina because "[the school] has accomplished and is accomplishing so much for the educational growth and prosperity of the state." Dr. Richard H. Lewis officially accepted the building for the university and commented: "Nothing appeals more to lusty youth than athletics in all its forms." He also hoped that the Athletic Association of the university would stand "to the athletic world."

The gym was placed under control of a faculty member that was a trained physician and an assistant. Dr. Robert Lawson (who had coached the baseball team) was revealed later to be the first faculty in charge and his assistant  was K. L. Wardlaw. In addition, Lawson was found to be a skilled gymnast and a favorite of the students.

One of the main reasons why the Tar Heels did not have a program until 1910 was due to difficulty of finding a place that had a comfortable temperature to play in. Bynum Gymnasium had been used for student's gymnastics beforehand and in ‘’The Tar Heel’’, the author wrote that Bynum could be used as the spot for the basketball team to practice because the building wasn't used at night. Bynum was known to have many issues including: the floors being slick, the backboard's were "a good deal liver" than most, and lighting was poor. The Tar Heels stopped playing in Bynum in 1924, and moved into the Tin Can. It replaced Bynum Gymnasium, a venue known for its unusual running track suspended above the court. The gymnasium housed a swimming pool and a suspended indoor track. There was a parallel exercises ladder, which often had the best view of the games. During one game in Bynum, the ladder gave way due to their weight and students were injured. While playing in Bynum Gymnasium, the Tar Heels joined the Southern Conference prior to the 1921–22 season. The team won the regular season championship in 1923 and 1924, while winning their post–season conference tournament in 1922 and 1924. The Tar Heels played thirteen seasons in Bynum and ended with a record of 61–15 (.803) in 76 total games.

After the Tar Heels' departure

On January 15, 1924, it was announced that the remodeling of Bynum Gymnasium was completed and it was reopened to students. The renovation was performed by Atwood and Nash. The modifications included reinforcing of the gallery and roof. The Tar Heel wrote that with the men's basketball team's relocation to the Tin Can, that it would not be as highly trafficked, thus allowing for more physical education courses. In October 1938, it was announced that $25,000 had been granted towards the gym again. Upon completion of the renovation, the facility would host the University press that had been using the basement floor. In addition, a third floor will be added to house the journalism department and news bureau. It was thought that the new location would greatly relieve the press' previous crowded conditions. Atwood and Weeks announced that the construction would start in December 1938. The building now maintains an administrative purpose including containing the cashier's office and contains offices for the Dean of Graduate Studies and the University counsel.

References

Footnotes

Citations

Bibliography

External links

Basketball venues in North Carolina
Defunct college basketball venues in the United States
Demolished buildings and structures in North Carolina
Indoor arenas in North Carolina
North Carolina Tar Heels basketball venues
Frank Pierce Milburn buildings
1904 establishments in North Carolina
Sports venues completed in 1904